Kuwait sent a delegation to compete at the 2008 Summer Paralympics in Beijing, People's Republic of China. According to official records, eight athletes competed in athletics, powerlifting and wheelchair fencing.

Athletics

3 competitors:

Men

Women

Powerlifting

1 competitor:

Men

Wheelchair Fencing

4 competitors:

Men

See also
Kuwait at the Paralympics
Kuwait at the 2008 Summer Olympics

External links
International Paralympic Committee

References

Nations at the 2008 Summer Paralympics
2008
Summer Paralympics